Gladys McCoy (February 28, 1928 – April 11, 1993) was an American politician who was the first African American elected to public office in the state of Oregon.

Biography
McCoy was born in 1928 in Chattanooga, Tennessee. She graduated from Talladega College in Talladega, Alabama, with a bachelor's degree in sociobiology. In 1967, she graduated with a master's degree in social work from Portland State University.

McCoy was elected to the board of the Portland Public Schools in 1970, becoming the first black person elected to public office in Oregon, and serving until 1978. Her husband Bill was elected to the Oregon House of Representatives in 1972. McCoy was elected to the Multnomah County Board of Commissioners in 1978, resigning in 1984 to unsuccessfully run for the Portland City Council. She successfully ran for county chair in 1986, serving until her death from thyroid cancer on April 11, 1993.

The McCoys had seven children.

Legacy
McCoy Park in Portland is named for Bill and Gladys McCoy. The Dream, a sculpture of Martin Luther King Jr. in Portland, is dedicated to them as well.

The Gladys McCoy Award was established in 1994. The award is given to an individual who has exemplified the life of the late Multnomah County Chair Gladys McCoy by making major contributions to civil rights, human rights, affirmative action, children and youth, family issues, community, neighborhood, local political party, local government, environmental issues, and/or education. The McCoy Award is presented annually by the Multnomah County Community Involvement Committee to somebody with outstanding lifetime volunteer service dedicated to improving the county community. Winners' names appear on permanent public display in the Multnomah County Boardroom.

In 2019, Multnomah County relocated its health department to a new building named after McCoy.

References

1928 births
1993 deaths
African-American people in Oregon politics
African-American women in politics
Multnomah County Commissioners
Politicians from Portland, Oregon
Talladega College alumni
Deaths from cancer in Oregon
Deaths from thyroid cancer
Portland State University alumni
20th-century American women politicians
20th-century American politicians
African-American history of Oregon
20th-century African-American women
20th-century African-American politicians